Theodore Christian Frye (September 15, 1869, Washington, Illinois – April 5, 1962, Seattle) was an American botany professor and one of the world's leading experts on bryology.

Biography
Born on a farm near Washington, Illinois, Theodore C. Frye was the eldest of five boys in a family of ten children. He embarked on a teaching career even before he had completed his own high school degree. By age 22, he had completed all the entrance requirements for his matriculation at the University of Illinois at Urbana–Champaign. There he graduated with a Bachelor of Science degree in 1894. From 1894 to 1896 he was a teacher and high school principal in Monticello, Illinois. From 1896 to 1897 he was a graduate student in botany at the University of Chicago. From 1897 to 1900 was superintendent of schools in Batavia, Illinois. From 1900 to 1902 he was a graduate student and an assistant in plant histology at the University of Chicago. There he graduated in 1902 with a Ph.D. in botany. His doctoral dissertation, supervised by John Merle Coulter, is entitled A Morphological Study of Certain Asclepiadaceae. From 1902 to 1903 Frye was a professor of biology at Morningside College in Iowa. In 1903 he was appointed professor and head of the botany department at the University of Washington, Seattle, where for his first five years he was the only botanist on the faculty.

Frye became a prolific plant collector in the Pacific Northwest region. In June 1908 in Seattle he married Else Marie Anthon. They collected plants together and she became an expert on alpine rock plants. Theodore C. Frye also collected plants with Robert Fiske Griggs and published, with George Burton Rigg, a flora of the Northwest in 1912. From 1914 to 1930 Frye was the director of the University of Washington's marine station at Friday Harbor (which was called "Puget Sound Biological Station" from about 1917/1918 until 1930 and "Puget Sound Marine Station" before the U.S.A. entered WW I). When he was the director he was also on the editorial board of The Puget Sound Marine Station Publications from 1915 to 1917 and The Puget Sound Biological Station Publications from 1918 to 1930.

Several species of kelp are edible seaweeds eaten in China, Korea, and Japan since prehistoric times. Frye and Charles Edward Magnusson experimented with a process of candying kelp bulbs for which they were granted a patent in July 1910. They 'came up with a product that looked and tasted like citron (which they called "Seatron") but the two scientists never carried the project beyond the patent stage.' In 1913 the U. S. Department of Agriculture appointed Frye and George Burton Rigg to make surveys of Alaskan kelp beds as an alternative source of potash. Frye's "bryophyte herbarium was one of the largest and best known collections in the American West."

Frye and his wife spent the summers of 1939, 1940, and 1941 collecting in Mexico. They had several children.

Awards and honors
 1908–1909 — President of the Sullivant Moss Society (now called the American Bryological and Lichenological Society)
 1909 — Fellow of the American Association for the Advancement of Science

Eponyms

Genera
 Fryeella gardneri

Species
 Fauchea fryeana
 Internoretia fryeana
 Limbella fryei (synonym: Sciaromium fryei)

Selected publications

References

External links
 
 

1869 births
1962 deaths
19th-century American botanists
20th-century American botanists
Bryologists
Plant collectors
University of Illinois Urbana-Champaign alumni
University of Chicago alumni
University of Washington faculty
People from Washington, Illinois